Shawn Elliott (February 24, 1937 – March 11, 2016) was an American actor and singer. He is best known for starring in the original cast of Jacques Brel is Alive and Well and Living in Paris onstage and as Paco in the film Short Eyes (1977).

Early years
Elliott was born Eliezer Santiago Solis in Santurce, Puerto Rico, and grew up in New York City's East Harlem area where he appeared in a community center production of Oklahoma!

Singing career
Elliott had a #1 hit in Europe and South America with a cover of Sir Lancelot's "Shame And Scandal In The Family" in 1965. The cover failed to chart in America where English comedian Lance Percival's version did. However, Peter Tosh and the Wailers, as well as The Blues Busters, copied the arrangement used by Elliot in preparing their own later covers of the song. Recorded a minor disco hit "Nice and Slow" in 1976.

Elliott originally recorded for Roulette Records, before moving with his brother Roland to Atlantic Records in 1968, though none of his later records matched the success of his 1965 hit.

Selected discography
”Goodbye My Lover,” 1962
”Sincerely and Tenderly,” 1963
"Shame And Scandal In The Family"; B-side "Josephine," 1964
”You Opened Up My Eyes,” 1967
”You’ve Turned Away," 1968
”Little Children,” 1968
”I Found Myself A Brand New Baby,” 1970
"Marieke"
"Child Is Father To The Man," 1971
"Mr. Love," 1976

Acting career
After his last single, Elliott turned increasingly to acting. He is known for his roles in the films Short Eyes, Beat Street,Crossover Dreams, Do The Right Thing, Impulse, 13 Conversations About One Thing, Double Take, and Arbitrage. His last screen credit was the 2013 film Broken City.

On TV, Elliott played Eduardo Fernandez, father of main characters Alex and Gaby, on the PBS children's show Ghostwriter. He also appeared in episodes of NBC's Law & Order, Lifetime's The Days and Nights of Molly Dodd, Miami Vice, CSI: Miami and American Family.

Elliott also appeared on Broadway in City of Angels (1989) and Marie Christine (1999) and off-Broadway and regionally in Jacques Brel is Alive and Well and Living in Paris, Cyrano De Bergerac, Senor Discretion Himself, Teresa's Ecstasy, Hamlet, Who's Afraid of Virginia Woolf, and Man of La Mancha.

A lifetime member of The Actors Studio, Elliott received a 1998 ALMA Award for Outstanding Latino Cast for PBS’ Foto-Novelas. In 2000, he was honored with the Rita Moreno Award for Excellence by the Hispanic Organization of Latin Artists (HOLA).

Personal life
Elliott married actress Donna Murphy in 1990. Elliott has two daughters from a previous relationship, Ivy Kaller and Justine McLaughlin. In 2006, Elliott and Murphy adopted a daughter, Darmia Hope Murphy Elliott.

Death
Elliott died on March 11, 2016, aged 79.

Filmography

References

External links

1937 births
2016 deaths
Male actors from New York City
People from Santurce, Puerto Rico
Place of death missing
People from East Harlem
Singers from New York City
20th-century American singers
20th-century American male actors
20th-century American male singers
21st-century American male actors
Method actors